is a private university in Daitō, Osaka, Japan. The predecessor of the school was founded in 1926, and it was chartered as a university in 2004. It is attached to Shijonawate Gakuen Junior College. It is located in front of Shijōnawate Station.

External links
 Official website 

Educational institutions established in 1926
Private universities and colleges in Japan
Universities and colleges in Osaka Prefecture
1926 establishments in Japan
Daitō, Osaka